The IMOCA 60 Class yacht DCNS was designed by Finot-Cong and launched in the 2008 after being built Multiplast shipyard in Vannes (for the hull and assembly), the deck was made by the Larros shipyard in Arcachon.

Racing Results

Gallery

Timeline

2008-2015 DCNS

2012 Film "En Solitaire"

2015-2017 Comme Un Seul Homme, FRA 1000

2017-2021 Groupe APICIL, FRA 1000

2022-Present 
In December 2021 it was announced the boat had been acquired by Tanguy Le Turquais for a 2024-2025 Vendée Globe campaign.

References

External links
IMOCA Class - Boat Page

Individual sailing vessels
2000s sailing yachts
Sailing yachts designed by Finot-Conq
Sailboat type designs by Groupe Finot
Sailboat types built by Multiplast
Vendée Globe boats
IMOCA 60